, fully titled as Magic Sword: Heroic Fantasy, is a side-scrolling fantasy hack-and-slash game released by Capcom for arcades in 1990. The game casts the player as a hero who must fight his way through a mystical tower in order to save the world. The player can use a sword, axe or magic, and can also rescue and recruit potential allies of various character classes, each of which has its own special abilities. Three years earlier, Capcom had released the similar Black Tiger.

Plot
Magic Sword takes place in an unnamed world, which is being threatened by the dark lord Drokmar, who has control over an evil crystal known as the "Black Orb", which would allow him to rule over the world. In order to prevent this from happening, the hero, known as the Brave One, must scale to the top of the 50-floor tower in which Drokmar resides, known as Dragon Keep.

At the game's end, when Drokmar is defeated, the player has the option of two endings: Destroy the Black Orb, or to take control of it, becoming the new dark lord.

Gameplay

Magic Sword shares many gameplay elements with Black Tiger. The game has side-scrolling fighting, with some platforming elements. The player controls only the main character. The accompanying ally, controlled by the computer, follows the player diligently and only attacks and jumps when the player does. Assistant characters consist of Amazon (archer), Big Man (wields an axe), Knight, Lizardman, Ninja, Priest, Thief and Wizard. The player is allowed to carry one item, which can assist the player or the current ally.

The player has a magic meter. It fills up while the player is not attacking, but it empties completely each time the player attacks. If the player attacks when the meter is empty or is blue, the player can only perform a melee attack when the standard attack button is used. Magical allies like the priest and the wizard will not attack in this situation. If it is red but not full, the player and any magical ally teamed up with him will perform a weak ranged magical attack alongside the melee attack. If it is full, the player and any magical ally teamed up with him will perform a strong ranged magical attack alongside the melee attack. Non-magical allies will attack when the player attacks regardless of the status of the magic meter.

The player's health is displayed as a set of five HP bars and a number next to the HP bars that counts the number of sets of five full HP bars beyond the ones that are shown on screen in case the player has more than five full HP bars. The ally has a separate HP meter that maxes out at four HP bars.

Full screen attacks can be performed either instantly when a magical book is collected or on demand at the cost of one full HP bar.

The game has about 50 levels, and multiple endings with two alternate outcomes. There are 51 floors to fight through in the game. Eight of these floors have boss characters at the end, including Drokmar himself at the end of the 50th floor. Additionally, there are seven "Secret Doors" which allows the player to bypass levels when specific maneuvers are performed.

Development
During development, Capcom was going to program the gameplay so the player could have up to two allies (four in total in a two-player game). The hardest part of the game was the placement of enemies in each stage. One of the last features implemented in the game was the secret doors. The game was being location-tested in Japan by April 1990.

The Super Nintendo version was announced at the 1992 Winter CES.

Ports
A single player-only port was released for the Super NES in 1992 and for mobile phones in 2008. A version for the Capcom Power System Changer was planned and previewed but never released. The full arcade version is included in Capcom Classics Collection Remixed for PlayStation Portable, Capcom Classics Collection Vol. 2 for PlayStation 2 and Xbox, and Capcom Arcade 2nd Stadium for Nintendo Switch, PlayStation 4, Xbox One, and Windows.

The arcade version was also released alongside Final Fight in a two-in-one bundle titled Final Fight: Double Impact for Xbox Live Arcade and PlayStation Network in April 2010.

Reception 

In Japan, the game had successful location tests by April 1990. Game Machine listed Magic Sword on their September 1, 1990 issue as being Japan's second most-successful table arcade unit of the month, outperforming titles such as Raiden and Teenage Mutant Ninja Turtles. In North America, it had a successful launch, with early orders of several thousand arcade units upon release, while performing very well at test locations. It was a hit at American arcades upon release. In November and December 1990, weekly coin drop earnings averaged $263.75 per arcade unit. It was the top-grossing software conversion kit on the RePlay arcade charts in November 1990.

The arcade game received positive reviews from critics. Julian Rignall of Computer and Video Games called it a "slick, colourful and well executed" game that "should appeal to any slash 'em up fan." Your Sinclair called it "an unoriginal but hugely playable coin-op."

The SNES version received mixed reviews from critics. Nintendo Power called it "the same great action game that debuted in the arcades, only now you have extra game options plus a stage select for the lower levels." Super Play criticized the animation for being awful, the sound effects as negligible, and the game slowing down at the slightest provocation, concluding it to be an “awful game” that was “kind of quite good fun in a way, if you sort of look sideways at it and squint”.

In other media

The American Street Fighter animated series episode "The Warrior King" (1997) is based on Magic Sword. This episode was part of a crossover storyline that spanned the other shows in the USA Action Extreme Team lineup (Savage Dragon, Mortal Kombat: Defenders of the Realm, and Wing Commander Academy).

References

External links

1990 video games
Arcade video games
Cancelled Capcom Power System Changer games
Capcom games
CP System games
Fantasy video games
Video games about magic
Video games about ninja
Mobile games
PlayStation 2 games
Super Nintendo Entertainment System games
PlayStation Network games
Video games developed in Japan
Video games scored by Manami Matsumae
Video games with alternate endings
Xbox 360 Live Arcade games